The white-lored tyrannulet (Ornithion inerme) is a species of bird in the family Tyrannidae. It is found in Bolivia, Brazil, Colombia, Ecuador, French Guiana, Guyana, Peru, Suriname, and Venezuela. Its natural habitats are subtropical or tropical moist lowland forest and subtropical or tropical swamps.

References

white-lored tyrannulet
Birds of the Amazon Basin
Birds of the Guianas
Birds of the Atlantic Forest
white-lored tyrannulet
Birds of Brazil
Taxonomy articles created by Polbot